Primera Fila (English: Front Row) is the first live album by Mexican singer-songwriter Thalía. The album was recorded in Miami, Florida at the BankUnited Center on July 29 and 30, 2009, with a selected audience to attend the concert. Primera Fila is Thalia's first project under the Sony Music label.

The album was released on 1 December 2009 in the United States and Latin America; in Europe and Asia it was released in April 2010. It includes duets with multi Grammy Award-winning Mexican singer and songwriter Joan Sebastian and the Puerto Rican musician Pedro Capó. It comprises mostly new songs but also includes a medley of four of her hits.

Primera Fila had sold near 1,5 million copies worldwide, an accomplishment for a Spanish-language album nowadays, and is one of the best-selling albums in Mexico. It spent 55 non-consecutive weeks at the top of Mexican charts.

Background

Thalía ended her contract with EMI Music in 2009, some months after the release of her album Lunada, because of the album's very low sales in comparison with her previous successful releases. In the meantime, Thalía had to recover from Lyme disease, a disease that put her health into serious danger. As a matter of fact, a big part of the press in her native Mexico mentioned that she would have to retire from music, at least until fully recovered. During that period, Thalía was not contracted to any record label; she had been completely devoted to her business activities and her radio program.

Finally, she signed a contract with Sony Music Entertainment and in July 2009, it was announced that she would record an album in acoustic format as her first official release under her new label, Sony Music Latin.

Development

Preparation

During an interview in Argentina, Thalía commented that she was preparing for six months in order to sing in a "new and fresh manner". In a 2010 interview, she confessed that during the last two years she reflected some traces of her that were obsolete and that converted her into a woman who accepts what she is, while she went on to express that she did not feel prepared in personal level, and that the album wouldn't have been the same if it was record in any previous moment in her life.

Paul Forat, vice president of Sony Music Latin, the person who had the idea of creating this project, stated that he always felt it would be fair for the audience and the mass media to see further than Thalía's celebrity substance and discover the "artist" in her. He went on to claim that "Thalía has an incredible voice and in that point of her artistic career, it was the right time for her to interpret with the intensity needed for these great songs. That's what Primera Fila was about".

In Primera Fila, Thalía composed two songs along with Leonel García (former member of the band Sin Bandera). According to Thalía herself, they needed one year and two months to choose the songs and discuss with various producers and songwriters.

Recording process

The album was recorded at the BankUnited Center in the University of Miami, Florida, in July 2009, with Thalía being accompanied to twelve musicians, and before a selected audience of approximately 300 guests. Before beginning to sing, Thalía expressed with a low and fragile voice and tears that she wanted to return to singing like the little girl she once was, the one that sang openly and honestly in front of her mirror. The private concert lasted about two hours and it costed more than 1 million $US, according to Billboard, which is an extraordinary cost for Spanish-language recording productions. During the performance, Thalía was wearing cowboy trousers and a plain white blouse, without making any wardrobe changes. The closing of the recital was with the song «Mujeres», written by Ricardo Arjona. Her final words were : «I missed the stage...I missed the microphones, thank you for coming and all this is exclusively for you».

Christian Pedraza from Ritmoson Latino described the concert as "a romantic and multifaceted acoustic concert", while he stated that "Thalía definitely left behind her all those outlandish hairstyles and eccentric wardrobe that had stigmatised her in the previous years». The same opinion was shared by various mass media, that pointed out an absolute change in Thalía's artistic personam as far as appearance is concerned. Thalía's husband, Tommy Mottola commented : "You previously knew Thalía the popular icon, now you will learn Thalía the artist". Generally, diverse mass media coincided that both the production and the new look marked a "before and after" in Thalía's career. Regarding to this issue, Thalía stated that there were three reasons for this change, "her maternity, her health problems, and a natural maturation in her spiritual life".

Album concept
Primera Fila is a "concept" strategy created by Sony Music Latin and initially aiming to present some of the top Latin artists while directly recording their music material before a small number of attendants. This "unplugged" format that would present artists in their most intimate and personal performance was the main concept of Primera Fila. Thalía was the second artist to record a Primera Fila album, after her compatriot Vicente Fernandez, and her album was the most successful in comparison to all the other releases that followed in the same series. The concept of the album is reasonably compared to the MTV Unplugged series, created by MTV Networks.Guillermo Gutiérrez, vicepresident of Sony Music, assured that «the intention is not to imitate MTV Unplugged but the process in indeed similar.[...] The production team of the artist is encharged of the cost and the audience has free access to the show». Both Warner and Sony Music have assured that «these recordings are not a manner of facing the crisis of the music industry but an escape to offering new music projects».

Reception

Critical response 

The album received highly favorable reviews from the music critics.Jason Birchmeier from Allmusic gave the album an extraordinary 4.5 out of 5 stars, naming the album as the "most surprising album Thalía has released in her whole career". James Christopher Monger from the same site, praised the production team, stating that "the album is one of the best produced, being it an accomplishment for a Spanish-language release". In the Amazon.com review, the album was described as "intimate, magic and unforgettable". Sigal Ratner from The San Diego Tribune congratulated Thalía for her interpretation and expressed the opinion that [Primera fila] «manages to offer one of the most mature performances that she has offered in her whole career». Sandra Mendoza Ortíz from Univision commented that with this album "she actually proved the fact that she can sing to those who would never believe it". Angelica Gisel Mora from American Online described the album as "the most innovative release in her singing career", while Russell Rúa from the Puerto Rican tabloid Primera Hora commented : "It's almost always that she uses playback in her TV performances, and she has never offered a concert in Puerto Rico. That's why, during her two decades in music as a solo artist, many people questioned or doubted about the talent or the vocal abilities of this physically gorgeous Mexican woman. The majority thought that Thalía was simply a product that gained popularity mostly because of her successful telenovelas back in the 90s. After many years, the answer finally came.[...] The result: spectacular. The artist unleashed her voice like never before, with honesty and potency, distanced from the choreographies and the glitter stuff that used to accompany her".

Michael Quaid from Enelshow.com rated the album with 4 out of 5 stars, commenting that he believes Thalía has always had the virtue of possessing one of the greatest voices in the Latin music panorama. Edwin P. Iturbide from Emet magazine stated : «[...] when you listen to her, when you watch her, you shall feel what she desires to transmit with her voice, and that is simplicity, pure talent, and smooth emotions to returning to the singer, the artist she used to be; in a stage with a few musicians and without the fear of the millions of people expecting to listen and watch: plain, great, reigning, magnificent, clear, fragile, simply herself». Daniel Kemich Reyes Hernández from the same magazine commented that «Thalia, apart from being a marketing product that had small periods of success either because of fashion, of time or because of the commerciality of the music genre (pop), can still prove through this production that her voice has matured and her repertoire as well». David Dorantes from the Houston Chronicle in a mixed review commented : «Primera fila is a well produced album, but falls short as an acoustic work, in comparison with other icons of Latin pop, like Julieta Venegas for example.[...] The arrangements are not interesting enough and remain common in pop music». Finally, Álex Madrigal from El Universal said that «Thalía stayed away from the meaningless and empty pop songs and focused on converting herself into an interpreter with a fresh and new artistic substance».

Responding to the reviews, Thalía stated : «Those who criticised my music and categorized me as a "product of marketing" now send me e-mails to tell me that they felt emotioned with this album. It's the best award I have been given in my life and it makes me feel proud of myself».

In the documentary Las muchas vidas de Thalía (The many lives of Thalía), she states that : «the glamour image that I had incorporated in my career and the comments surrounding me, functioned as reason enough for my artistic and interpreting abilities to be judged and doubted». Finally, she went on to admit that she didn't feel a victim, because in many cases she didn't do anything to detain what was being told and in other cases, she was even feeding those comments herself.

Commercial performance
The album achieved immense success in Mexico, debuting a top of the country's both physical and digital album charts. In the United States, it also debuted at the first position in both the Top Latin and Latin Pop album charts, published by Billboard, surpassing the sales of Mi navidad and La Gran Señora (by Andrea Bocelli and Jenni Rivera respectively) that were released in the same period. In the Billboard 200 album chart, it peaked at outside the top 100. In Brazil, the album reached number-one position in the country's international albums chart. In Europe, precisely in Greece, the album reached number six in the International albums chart, an especially high placing for a Spanish-language album, surpassing other singers' albums in that period in Greece including Lady Gaga, Justin Bieber, Westlife and The Black Eyed Peas among others. In Spain, the album peaked at number thirty-two and remained in the chart for twelve consecutive weeks.

By the end of 2010, Sony Music informed that the album had been certified as gold in Argentina by CAPIF for sales exceeding 20,000 copies. In the territory of Central America the album achieved platinum certification by the end of 2011 for sales over 10,000 copies. In 2012, it had already been certified as quadruple platinum by AVINPRO for sales exceeding 40,000 copies, becoming the highest selling album in Venezuela in the last 5 years. In Mexico, the album was certified as gold in the first day of its release, according to Esmas. As the months passed, the album remained in the top 5 positions gaining more certifications. In October 2010, it was announced by Sony Music Mexico that the album had achieved a diamond certification, which equals 300,000 copies sold. According to Nielsen SoundScan, Primera Fila sold 96,000 units as of 2011 in the United States, although sources such as El Universal reported sales of over 250,000 copies there.

Manuel Cuevas, vice president of Sony Music Mexico commented: "People became connected to these songs from the very beginning. For us, as a company, it was complicated since we all know the influence of Thalía in the past 20 years in the Latin music industry but she had never had such an explosion in her popularity as an interpreter...people recognised her and embraced this project from the first day it came out." During the whole year, the album remained at number one in Mexico for many weeks, beating artists like Justin Bieber, Shakira, Susan Boyle, Metallica, Britney Spears, Kesha, Miley Cyrus, Alejandro Fernández, David Guetta, Vicente Fernández, Michael Jackson and Madonna among others. In that year, the album was converted into the second best selling album in Mexico. Furthermore, it became the best selling Latin pop album worldwide in 2010. In March 2012, with already 117 consecutive weeks in the chart, the album was awarded for selling over 500,000 copies in Mexico. In July 2012, the album broke the record for being the album with the most weeks within the Mexican chart beating Madonna's The Immaculate Collection and Club Life Volume Two: Miami by Tiësto. In the United States, the 3 versions of the album (CD,DVD,CD+DVD) sold 90,000 together, till August 2010, according to Nielsen SoundScan.

In the first quarter of 2011, it was estimated that the album had sold over 1 million copies worldwide. David Palafox, promoter of Sony Music stated that "Thalía is the artist with the biggest sales (currently) in the label", concluding that "since the release of Primera Fila, she has been unstoppable. She keeps on selling like crazy".

Personnel

Cristina Abaroa - Music Preparation
Cheche Alara - Arreglos, Fender Rhodes, Piano
Ricardo Arjona - Composer
Aureo Baqueiro - Arreglos, Producer
Reyli Barba - Composer
Nick Baxter - Pro-Tools
Maria Bernal - Composer
Pedro Capó - Primary Artist
Isabel de Jesús - A&R
Mario Domm - Composer
Estéfano - Composer
Alonso Salgado Fabio - Composer
Marco Flores - Composer
Paul Forat - Producer
Leonel García - Composer
Shari Girdlestone - Contractor
Juan Luis Guerra - Composer
Leyla Hoyle - Coros
Antonio Marcos - Composer
Mário Marcos - Composer
Nate Morton - Bateria
Justin Moskevich - Pro-Tools
Tommy Mottola - Executive Producer
Carlos Murguía - Coros
Joanne Oriti - Associate Producer
Raúl Ornelas - Composer
Espinoza Paz - Composer
Donato Póveda - Composer
Mario Pupparo - Composer
Julio Reyes - Composer
Matt Rohde - Wurlitzer
Kike Santander - Composer
Joan Sebastían - Composer, Primary Artist
Thalia - Composer, Primary Artist, Quotation Author
Afo Verde - Composer
Ileana Vogel - Coros
Paco Peres - producer remixer

Track listing

Notes
1 Medley : "Entre el mar y una estrella","Piel morena", "No me enseñaste", "Amor a la mexicana"
2 Remixed by Paco Perez
3 Produced by Lenny Santos (Aventura)
DVD and Blu-ray editions feature the concert plus the documentary "Las muchas vidas de Thalía"

Singles 
 Equivocada - Official First Single
 Enséñame a Vivir (iTunes Promo) - Official Third Single: Argentina, Central America and Spain.
 Estoy Enamorado "Duet with Pedro Capó"(iTunes Promo) - Official Third Single: Mexico, the United States and Puerto Rico.
 El Próximo Viernes (iTunes Promo)
 Medley (Video Promo Single)
 Qué Será De Ti (Como vai você) / Qué Será De Ti (Banda Version) - Official Second Single
 Con La Duda "Duet with Joan Sebastian" (Radio Single) - Official Third Single: For Regional Radio in Mexico, the United States and Puerto Rico.
 Mujeres (Radio Single)
 Cuando Te Beso (Radio Single)

Digital singles 
 Pienso En Ti (2009)
 Estoy Enamorado [Karaoke](2010)
 Enséñame A Vivir [Remix] (2010) produced by Paco Perez.

Charts

Weekly charts

Monthly Charts

Year-end charts

Certifications and sales

Accolades and awards
Latin Grammy Awards

|-
| style="text-align:center;"| 2010
| style="text-align:center;"| Primera fila
| style="text-align:center;"| Best Long Form Music Video
|

Premios Oye!

|-
| style="text-align:center;" rowspan="2"| 2010
| style="text-align:center;" rowspan="2"| Primera fila
| style="text-align:center;"| General Spanish / Album of the year
|
|-
| style="text-align:center;"| Spanish Pop / Female solo singer
|
|-
| style="text-align:center;"| 2011
| style="text-align:center;"| Primera fila... un año después
| style="text-align:center;"| Spanish Pop / Female solo singer
|

Premios Orgullosamente Latino

|-
| style="text-align:center;" rowspan="2"| 2010
| style="text-align:center;" rowspan="2"| Primera fila
| style="text-align:center;"| Female singer
|
|-
| style="text-align:center;"| Latin album of the year
|

Premios Lo Nuestro

|-
| style="text-align:center;"| 2010
| style="text-align:center;"| Primera fila
| style="text-align:center;"| "Young artist legacy" Award
|
|-
| style="text-align:center;"| 2011
| style="text-align:center;"| Primera fila
| style="text-align:center;"| Female singer
|

Premios Juventud

|-
| style="text-align:center;" rowspan="5"| 2010
| style="text-align:center;" rowspan="4"| Primera fila
| style="text-align:center;"| Chica que me quita el sueño
|
|-
| style="text-align:center;"| Mi artista pop
|
|-
| style="text-align:center;"| Mi ídolo es...
|
|-
| style="text-align:center;"| Me muero sin ese cd 
|
|-
| style="text-align:center;"| Equivocada
| style="text-align:center;"| Canción corta venas
|

Premios Telehit

|-
| style="text-align:center;" rowspan="3"| 2010
| style="text-align:center;" rowspan="3"| Primera fila
| style="text-align:center;"| Pop artist of the year
|
|-
| style="text-align:center;"| Popular artist
|
|-
| style="text-align:center;"| World's most important artist
|

Premios EñE de la música

|-
| style="text-align:center;" rowspan="5"| 2010
| style="text-align:center;" rowspan="3"| Equivocada
| style="text-align:center;"| Best international song in Spanish-speaking world
|
|-
| style="text-align:center;"| Best female singer in Spanish-speaking world
|
|-
| style="text-align:center;"| Best international record in Spanish-speaking world
|
|-
| style="text-align:center;"| Qué será de ti
| style="text-align:center;"| Best cover, version or live in Spanish-speaking world
|
|-
| style="text-align:center;"| Primera fila
| style="text-align:center;"| Best international album in Spanish-speaking world
|

References

External links
Thalía: Quiero romper mis estereotipos
Primera fila sales at El Financiero

Thalía live albums
2009 live albums
Spanish-language live albums
Primera Fila albums
Sony Music Latin live albums
Thalía video albums
Sony Music Latin video albums